World Hearing Day is a campaign held each year by Office of Prevention of Blindness and Deafness of the World Health Organization (WHO). Activities take place across the globe and an event is hosted at the World Health Organization on March 3. The campaign's objectives are to share information and promote actions towards the prevention of hearing loss and improved hearing care. The first event was held in 2007. Before 2016 it was known as International Ear Care Day. Each year, the WHO selects a theme, develops educational materials, and makes these freely available in several languages. It also coordinates and reports on events around the globe. Individuals and communities involved in hearing care are encouraged to organize activities to raise awareness about the importance of ear and hearing care and encourage them to seek services.

2023 
The theme for 2023 and subsequent years is "Ear and hearing care for all! Let’s make it a reality".  Not only will World Hearing Day 2023 highlight the importance of integrating ear and hearing care within primary care, as an essential component of universal health coverage but also provide tools for that integration or expansion of services.   A a new training manual "Primary ear and hearing care training manual for health workers and general practitioners" was released on March 3, 2023, and it is accompanied with a trainer’s handbook and other community resources.  A video by WHO's director-general Tedros Adhanom Ghebreyesus explains the effort. Wiki4WorldHearingDay2023 an edit-a-thon, was part of the 2023 activities of the campaign, to facilitate the contribution of hearing-related content into Wikipedia in several languages. Activities were reported in a Wikimedia dashboard.

2022 
The theme of  World Hearing Day 2022 was “To hear for life, listen with care.” 
Key messages and information focus on the importance and means of preventing hearing loss from recreational sounds through safe listening. During World Hearing Day 2022 these resources were launched:

 a Global standard for safe listening entertainment venues and events, detailing safe listening features. The features can be implemented by governments, venue and event owners, and event staff such as audio engineers.
 an mSafeListening handbook, on how to create an mHealth safe listening program.
 and a media toolkit for journalists containing key information and how to talk about safe listening.

2021 
The theme of the campaign for 2021 was "Hearing Care for All." The launch of the World Report on Hearing (WRH)  took place on March 3, 2021, during an event at the World Health Organization in Geneva. It was a global call for action to address hearing loss and ear diseases across the life course.  The WRH was developed to provide guidance for WHO Member States to integrate ear and hearing care into their national health plan per the World Health Assembly resolution WHA70.13, adopted in 2017.  The report includes epidemiological and financial data on hearing loss; outlines available cost-effective solutions and sets the way forward through integrated people-centered ear and hearing care. The global launch of the report was followed by regional launches involving the participation of ministries of health and other participants from several Member States. The report's reach is global but includes a special focus on low- and middle-income countries, where the number of people with hearing loss is not matched by the availability of services and resources.

2020 

The theme of the campaign for 2020 was "Hearing for Life. Don't let hearing loss limit you". The selection of the theme by the World Health Organization expresses the key message that timely and effective interventions can ensure that people with hearing loss are able to achieve their full potential. It recognizes that, at all life stages, communication and good hearing health connect us to each other, our communities, and the world. It highlights that appropriate and timely interventions can facilitate access to education, employment and communication. Unfortunately, across the globe, ear and hearing care are insufficient, and the WHO argues that all public health systems should include ear and hearing care. One of the products that came out from the 2020 campaign was a WHO Report for Basic Ear and Hearing Care.

Previous years 
2019: The theme of the campaign for 2019 was "Check your hearing" as data from both developed and developing countries indicate that a significant part of the burden associated with hearing loss comes from unaddressed hearing difficulties.

A study conducted in the United Kingdom indicate that only 20% of those who have a hearing problem seek treatment. A study performed in South Africa reported that individuals who experience hearing difficulties wait between 5 and 16 years to seek diagnosis and treatment. Two hundred and ninety one events/activities from 81 countries were registered, and will be described in their annual report. For the celebration, on February 25, 2019, WHO launched hearWHO, a free application for mobile devices which allows people to check their hearing regularly and intervene early in case of hearing loss. The app is targeted at those who are at risk of hearing loss or who already experience some of the symptoms related to hearing loss.

Wiki4WorldHearingDay2019, an edit-a-thon, was part of the 2019 activities of the campaign, to facilitate the contribution of hearing-related content into Wikipedia in several languages. Activities were reported in a Wikimedia dashboard and summarized a few publications. In addition, a Meet-up took place with presentations by researchers from HEAR in Cincinnati, from the National Institute for Occupational Safety and Health, the National Center on Birth Defects and Developmental Disabilities and National Center for Environmental Health, of the Centers for Disease Control and Prevention, by the Wikipedian-in-Residence from the National Institute for Occupational Safety and Health, and the Wikipedia Consultant for Cochrane.

2018: The theme of World Hearing Day 2018 was "Hear the future" to highlight the estimates of an increase in the number of people with hearing loss around the world in the coming decades.

2017: The theme of World Hearing Day 2017 was “Action for hearing loss: make a sound investment”, which focused on the economic impact of hearing loss.

2016: The theme of World Hearing Day 2016 was “Childhood hearing loss: act now, here is how!” which provided information on public health measures that could prevent significant percentage of cases of hearing loss in children.

2015: The theme for World Hearing Day was “Make Listening Safe”, which drew attention to the rising problem of noise-induced hearing loss due to recreational exposure.

See also 

 Hearing
 Hearing loss
 Tinnitus
 Health problems of musicians
Safe listening
Safe-in-Sound Award

References

External links 

 World Health Organization, Prevention of Blindness and Deafness, World Hearing Day.
 A recording for 2019 meetup for the Wiki4WorldHearingDay2019 campaign. 
Make Listening Safe, initiative by the World Health Organization to promote safe listening practices
World Health Organization- Short videos on World Hearing Day materials, available in six languages.

World Health Organization
Hearing
Audiology
Health promotion
Health awareness days